The Department of Land & Land Reforms & Refugee Relief & Rehabilitation of West Bengal is a Bengal government department. It is a ministry mainly responsible for the formulation of policies, Acts, Rules and procedures relating to land matters, namely, land records and survey, land revenue, land reforms, land use, management of government lands, requisition and acquisition of land as well as their implementation by way of preparation and revision of Records of right, including recording of sharecroppers (bargadars); vesting and distribution of ceiling surplus land; determination of the requirement of land by tea gardens, factories etc.; mutation of ownership and conversion of classification of land; assessment and collection of land revenue and cesses; requisition and acquisition of land administration of the Calcutta Thika and other Tenancies and Lands (Acquisition & Regulation) Act, 1981, the West Bengal Premises Tenancy Act, 1997, the West Bengal Public Demand Recovery, 1913 and other Acts.

Ministerial Team 
The ministerial team at the MHA is headed by the Cabinet Minister for Land & Land Reforms, who may or may not be supported by Ministers of State. Civil servants are assigned to them to manage the ministers' office and ministry.

The current head of the ministry is Mamata Banerjee who is also the Chief Minister of West Bengal.

Previously Minister of Land and Land Reform is also known as Minister of Land and Land Revenue in 1967 because many people's land was in 'Benami' so for thats why that time this ministry office was also known as minister of land and land revenue and this office was held by Hare Krishna Konar and in 1969 this office was renamed to Minister of Land and Land Reforms. And was succeeded by Benoy Choudhury in 1977.

Previous heads of the ministry include:
 Hare Krishna Konar (1967-1968), (1969-1970)
 Benoy Choudhury (1977-1996)
 Mamata Banerjee (2011-2022)

References 

Government of West Bengal
West Bengal
West Bengal, Ministry of Land and Land Reforms
Government departments of West Bengal